Chestnut Hill East station is a SEPTA Regional Rail station in Philadelphia, Pennsylvania. Located at 102–04 Bethlehem Pike at Chestnut Hill Avenue, it serves the Chestnut Hill East Line. The current station building was built in 1931 by the Reading Railroad, as a replacement for an earlier station that existed between 1872 and 1930.

The station is in zone 2 on the Chestnut Hill East Line, on former Reading Railroad tracks, and is 10.8 track miles from Suburban Station. In 2013, this station saw 433 boardings and 479 alightings on an average weekday.  Chestnut Hill East is often confused with Chestnut Hill West, which is a SEPTA station a few minutes away from Chestnut Hill East's location. Boarding statistics, however, show greater usage of this line than of the Chestnut Hill West Line by Chestnut Hill residents.

Prior to rebuilding and electrification circa 1931, the stub terminal had three short passenger car tracks serviced by two platforms, a small engine terminal with a turntable, five-stall roundhouse and water tank, plus a few freight tracks serving storage buildings and a coal and lumber business.

Station layout

References

External links
SEPTA – Chestnut Hill East Station
2000 Kevin Leary Photo
Chestnut Hill East Station (WorldNYCSubway.org)
 Station House from Google Maps Street View

SEPTA Regional Rail stations
Former Reading Company stations
Railway stations in the United States opened in 1872